"I Belong" is a song that served as the 's entry in the Eurovision Song Contest 1965. Its music was written by singer Daniel Boone (credited under his real name, Peter Lee Sterling), and its lyrics were written by Phil Peters. It was performed at Eurovision by Kathy Kirby, where it came in 2nd place, losing to 's "Poupée de cire, poupée de son", performed by France Gall. Kirby also recorded the song as a single, and it peaked on the music charts at No. 36 in Britain and No. 5 in Singapore.

Lyrics
The song tells of the joy of finding true love for the first time, after a string of bad relationships:
But now my heart has recovered 
From past affairs that turned wrong 
All my dreams are uncovered
I belong, I belong, I belong

At Eurovision
The song was performed by Kirby at Eurovision 1965, held in Naples on 21 March 1965. The song was performed second on the night, following the ' "'t Is genoeg" sung by Conny Vandenbos and preceding 's "¡Qué bueno, qué bueno!" sung by Conchita Bautista. By the close of voting, it had received 26 points, placing it 2nd in a field of 18.

Other versions
Kirby also recorded a version of the song in Italian.

References

External links
 Official Eurovision Song Contest site, history by year, 1965

Eurovision songs of the United Kingdom
Eurovision songs of 1965
1965 songs
Decca Records singles
Songs written by Daniel Boone (singer)